William Albert Sampy (22 January 1901 – 1973) was an English footballer who played as a right back.

Career
Sampy was playing for local side Chopwell Colliery when he was signed by league side Sheffield United in May 1921. United paid £250 for the services of Sampy and teammate Jimmy Waugh, but whereas Waugh went on to become a regular in the first team, Sampy was largely seen as a reserve and did not make his league debut until October 1924 in an away match against Bury. Occasionally featuring in the league from that point on, Sampy did not get a consistent run in the side until the 1925–26 season.

In March 1927 Sampy was signed by Swansea Town for £500 but spent much of his three seasons there in the reserves, making only 41 league appearances. In the summer of 1930 Sampy was granted a free transfer and joined Waterford in Ireland, initially as a player and then as player-manager from 1931. Returning to England, Sampy then joined non-league Nelson with whom he spent one season.

Personal life
Born in Backworth, Northumberland, Bill Sampy was the younger brother of fellow Sheffield United player Tommy Sampy, although the two only played together on very rare occasions.

References

1901 births
1973 deaths
People from Backworth
Footballers from Tyne and Wear
English footballers
Association football defenders
Chopwell Colliery F.C. players
Sheffield United F.C. players
Swansea City A.F.C. players
Waterford F.C. players
Nelson F.C. players
English Football League players
League of Ireland players
Waterford F.C. managers
League of Ireland managers
Expatriate association footballers in the Republic of Ireland
English football managers